In mathematics, especially in the area of algebra studying the theory of abelian groups, an essential subgroup is a subgroup that determines much of the structure of its containing group.  The concept was generalized to essential submodules.

Definition
A subgroup  of a (typically abelian) group  is said to be essential if whenever H is a non-trivial subgroup of G, the intersection of S and H is non-trivial: here "non-trivial" means "containing an element other than the identity".

References
 

Subgroup properties
Abelian group theory